A category killer is a retailer, often a big-box store, that specializes in and carries a large product assortment of a given category. Their wide merchandise selections, deep supply, large buying power, and a comparative advantage to other retailers can "kill" a category. Stores will also die from their limited selections. In essence, they are a price- or discount-based specialist mass-retailer. Through selection, pricing and market penetration they obtain a massive competitive advantage over other retailers. 

Chains such as OfficeMax, Best Buy, Bed Bath & Beyond and Hobby Lobby were considered category killers.

Once typically found in power centers, increasingly they are found in or adjacent to (as an outbuilding of) repurposed traditional malls.

Large category killer stores are mostly in mid- and large-sized cities, because a large population is required to be feasible.

Impact 
Local merchants in cities with category killers "may suffer a substantial reduction in sales," and stores in a wider radius can be affected by the draw. Between 1983 and 1993, Iowans spent 31% less in hardware stores, translating to a loss of 37% in the same time to those stores as a result of category killer stores.

Retailers 
Sporting goods stores that are category killers range in footprint from .Home Depot carries 30,000 items in  stores.

See also
 Big-box store

References

External links 
 

Competition (economics)
Brand management
Retail formats
Power centers (retail)
Superstores